Alva Donald Stallings (born November 18, 1938) is a former American football defensive lineman in the National Football League for the Washington Redskins.  He played college football at the University of North Carolina and was drafted in the fifth round of the 1960 NFL Draft.

1938 births
Living people
American football defensive ends
American football defensive tackles
North Carolina Tar Heels football players
Washington Redskins players
Sportspeople from Rocky Mount, North Carolina
Players of American football from North Carolina